Culberson may refer to:

Places
 Culberson County, Texas
 Culberson, North Carolina

People with the surname
 Aubert Culberson Dunn (1896–1987), American politician and U.S. Representative from Mississippi
 Charles Allen Culberson (1855–1925), American politician, Governor of Texas and U.S. Senator
 Charlie Culberson (born 1989), American baseball player
 Chicita F. Culberson (born 1931), American lichenologist
 David B. Culberson (1830–1900), American politician and U.S. Representative from Texas
 Eric Culberson (born 1966), American musician
 John Culberson (born 1956), American politician and U.S. Representative from Texas
 Leon Culberson (1919–1989), American baseball player
 Quinton Culberson (born 1985), American football player
 Sarah Culberson (born 1976), American philanthropist and Mende princess
 Winfield Culberson Dunn (born 1927), American politician and Governor of Tennessee
 William Louis Culberson (1929–2003), American lichenologist

Other uses
 26990 Culbertson, a main-belt asteroid

See also
Culbertson (name), a surname